Junius Brutus may refer to:

 Decimus Junius Brutus (disambiguation)
 Marcus Junius Brutus, assassin of Julius Caesar
 Marcus Junius Brutus (tribune 83 BC), father of preceding
 Lucius Junius Brutus, legendary founder of the Roman Republic
 Lucius Junius Brutus Damasippus

See also
 
 Gaius Junius Bubulcus Brutus, Roman consul in 317 and 311 BC
 Junia gens